FarmBot is an open source precision agriculture CNC farming project consisting of a Cartesian coordinate robot farming machine, software and documentation including a farming data repository. The project aims to "Create an open and accessible technology aiding everyone to grow food and to grow food for everyone." FarmBot is an open source project allowing hardware, software and documentation modifications and additions from users.

History 

The FarmBot project was started in 2011 by American Rory Aronson whilst studying mechanical engineering at California Polytechnic State University. Aronson attended an elective course in organic agriculture where he learned about a tractor that used machine vision to detect and cover weeds which removed the need for herbicides or manual labour, the tractor cost over US$1 million.

In September 2013 Aronson published a white paper outlining the goals of the project to "Grow a community that produces free and open-source hardware plans, software, data, and documentation enabling everyone to build and operate a farming machine."

The project is a response to the 60% increase food production needed due to the growth in world population to between 7 - 9 billion by 2050 and the potential of precision agriculture to reduce the environmental impacts of farming by reducing water use, energy, transportation, petrochemicals and time required to grow crops.

In March 2014 Aronson began working on the project full-time funded by a grant from the Shuttleworth Foundation. Firmware developer Tim Evers and software developer Rick Carlino later joined the project as core developers and the open source community Farmbot.cc was created to support the development of the project.

In March 2014 Rory Aronson created the company Farmbot.io to provide hardware kits and software services and to serve as a funding source to maintain the open source community. In 2014 and 2015 FarmBot was entered into the Hackaday Prize where it became a finalist in 2015. Farmbot.io began preorders of the first commercially available version of FarmBot, the FarmBot Genesis, the ninth iteration of the design in July 2016.

Farmbot Genesis

Capabilities 
The FarmBot Genesis is able to plant over 30 different crops including potatoes, peas, squash, artichokes and chard in an area of 2.9 meters × 1.4 meters with a maximum plant height of 0.5 meters. It can cultivate a variety of crops within same area at the same time and is able to operate indoors, outdoors and covered areas. It is estimated that the FarmBot Genesis produces 25% fewer carbon dioxide emissions than standard US food production.

The Farmbot Genesis can perform almost all processes prior to harvesting including sowing, mechanical weed control and watering. It requires electricity, an internet connection and water supply which can be provided using off grid solutions including a water barrel to collect rain and a solar panel and battery to provide electricity. The FarmBot Genesis is able to gather data to take into account factors such as age of the plant and local weather conditions from both local sensors and external data from the internet.

The FarmBot Genesis performs different tasks through automatically attaching different tools to a universal tool mount, including a seed injector, a watering nozzle and a tool to bury weeds. The machine is able to weed the planted area using the weed suppressor using a camera to identify weeds by comparing all plants in the area to the locations of the planted seeds.
  

FarmBot Genesis is controlled through a web based interface allowing remote access from any location on most internet enabled devices. It uses an online crop database called OpenFarm to create an optimal planting plan based on the size of the adult crop. The precision of the machine makes it suitable for lab conditions.

Components

Hardware 

The Farmbot Genesis is an open source hardware machine and is designed around reproduce-ability and  availability of components, it can be created using common tools and processes meaning it is not reliant on a single supplier.

The machine uses linear guides in the X, Y, and Z axis including the gantry and custom flat connecting plates that can be fabricated with a number of tools including water jet cutter, plasma cutter, laser cutter, CNC mill or manually with a hacksaw and drill press. The FarmBot Genesis uses a belt and pulley system including NEMA 17 stepper motors with rotary encoders, GT2 belts and OpenBuilds V-Slot® extrusions and wheels. Stainless steel screws, t-nuts, washers, bearings, driveshaft and leadscrew make the machine weather and corrosion-resistant allowing long term operation in outdoor environments.

The Farmbot Genesis electronics stack consists of a Raspberry Pi 3 and Arduino Mega 2560 with a RAMPS 1.4 shield and a camera to record data. The universal tool mount and other tools are 3D printed and are designed to be created with hobby level fused deposition model 3D printers e.g. a RepRap printer. It has two electrical connections and connectors for liquid or gas which are magnetically coupled.

Software 
The software for the FarmBot Genesis runs through a web interface allowing the machine to be controlled on most internet enabled devices. The web app has the ability to adjust different inputs including water, fertilizer and pesticide, seed spacing and environmental factors including soil and weather conditions based on sensor readings, location, and time of year. It is also able to build and schedule sequences by combining and altering basic operations. The software is also able to manipulate data maps, real-time logging and access an open plant data in the OpenFarm database. All software is available under the MIT license and is available on GitHub.

Documentation 
The documentation for FarmBot Genesis consists of hardware and software documentation, a farming database and support forums. A wiki, forum and documentation provide hardware and software documentation including assembly instructions, bill of materials, troubleshooting, documentation of past iterations and future design plans. OpenFarm is a free and open collaboratively written database of crop growing guides and other knowledge.  OpenFarm began as part of FarmBot but has become its own independent project.

See also
 Open Source Ecology
 RepRap project

References

External links
 Official product website
 FarmBot Project community website
 FarmBot Github repository
 Open Source Automated Precision Farming, Rory Aronson, TEDxUCLA 2017  
 Rory Aronson speaks at TEDx UCLA in 2014
 Interview and guide by Rory Aronson

Open hardware electronic devices
DIY culture
3D printing
Engineering projects
Computing output devices
Agricultural machinery
Open hardware organizations and companies
Free software
Fused filament fabrication
Agricultural robotics